Study guides can be broad based to facilitate learning in a number of areas, or be resources that foster comprehension of literature, research topics, history, and other subjects.

General topics include study and testing strategies; reading, writing, classroom, and project management skills; as well as techniques for learning as an adult, with disabilities, and online.  Some will summarize chapters of novels or the important elements of the subject. Study guides for math and science often present problems (as in problem-based learning) and will offer techniques of resolution.

Academic support centers in schools often develop study guides for their students, as do for-profit companies and individual students and professors. Once only found at local five and dime stores the internet brought about a new era of online sites with study material.  Only CliffsNotes survived this transition to the internet.  Examples of companies that produce study guides include Coles Notes, SparkNotes, CliffsNotes, Schaum's Outlines, Permacharts, and Study Notes.

Some high school teachers or college professors may compose study guides for their students to assist them with reading comprehension, content knowledge, or preparation for an examination.  These study guides may be issued as an assignment to be completed or as a comprehensive selection of material assembled by the teacher.

Study guides can be presented in video format, which are referred to as "video study kk". An example is 60second Recap. Such "video-centric" educational materials are, increasingly, taking hold in the classroom, both in response to cultural preferences and research.

See also
Guide to information sources
Homework
Problem-based learning
Electronic learning
Study skills
Study Notes
Syllabus
FlashNotes
Pathfinder (library science)

References

School terminology
Textbook business
Study guides